Mireille Fanon Mendès-France also Mireille Fanon-Mendès France (born in 1948) is a French jurist and anti-racist activist.

Career
Fanon Mendès-France has been teaching at Paris Descartes University. She was also a visiting professor at the University of California, Berkeley in international law and conflict resolution. She has also worked for UNESCO and the French National Assembly. Since 2011, she was an expert for the United Nations Working Group on People of African Descent. She was the president of that UN Working Group from 2014 to 2016.

Views
In an interview at the Council of Europe in 2020, Fanon Mendès-France called for a new Universal Declaration of Human Rights that has to be recast according to Fanon Mendès-France to no longer reflect a Eurocentric version of the definition of human beings.
Fanon Mendès-France acted as board member of the Jewish French Union for Peace and expressed solidarity and support for State of Palestine.

Family History
Fanon Mendès-France is the daughter of the French political philosopher Frantz Fanon. She is a scholar of decolonisation and a member of the Frantz Fanon Foundation. According to Fanon Mendès-France, her father Frantz Fanon was "blacklisted" in France, where she found it difficult to organize events to honor his memory. 

Fanon Mendès-France is the widow of Bernard Mendès-France, the son of the French politician Pierre Mendès France, who served as president of the Council of Ministers under the French Fourth Republic.

References

1948 births
Anti-racism
French anti-racism activists
French people of Martiniquais descent
Living people
University of California, Berkeley faculty